Very Tall is a 1962 album by the jazz pianist Oscar Peterson and his trio, with the vibraphonist Milt Jackson.

This album marked the first recorded collaboration between Peterson and Jackson; they would later appear together on the albums Reunion Blues (1971), The Milt Jackson Big 4 (1975), Ain't But a Few of Us Left (1981), and Two of the Few (1983).

Reception

The initial Billboard review from January 27, 1962 praised Peterson and Jackson's "great sense of swing" and described the material as "a bit out of the ordinary", before concluding that album was "Strong jazz wax."

Down Beat magazine jazz critic Leonard Feather gave the album four stars in his April 12, 1963 review and stated: "This was an alliance as successful as it was logical. Peterson and Jackson have far more in common musically than their regular contexts might imply."

Scott Yanow on Allmusic.com gave the album four stars out of five. Yanow described the pairing of Peterson and Jackson as "...so logical that it is surprising it did not occur five years earlier...Fortunately O.P. and Bags would meet up on records many times in the future (particularly during their Pablo years) but this first effort is a particularly strong set."

Track listing
"On Green Dolphin Street" (Bronislaw Kaper, Ned Washington)  – 7:32
"Heartstrings" (Milt Jackson)  – 5:43
"Work Song" (Nat Adderley, Oscar Brown, Jr.)  – 7:35
"John Brown's Body" (Traditional)  – 7:49
"A Wonderful Guy" (Oscar Hammerstein II, Richard Rodgers)  – 4:57
"Reunion Blues" (Jackson)  – 7:22

Personnel
Oscar Peterson – piano
Milt Jackson – vibraphone
Ray Brown – double bass
Ed Thigpen – drums

References 

1961 albums
Albums produced by Norman Granz
Milt Jackson albums
Oscar Peterson albums
Verve Records albums